Badreddine Azzouzi (born 12 November 1996) is a Belgian footballer who plays as a left-back for Belgian Division 2 club Tubize-Braine.

Career
Azzouzi joined Meux in August 2017. He played for the club until the summer 2019, where he joined Walhain. He returned to his first club Tubize-Braine in 2020.

References

External links

 https://globalsportsarchive.com/people/soccer/badreddine-azzouzi/112577/

1996 births
Living people
Belgian footballers
A.F.C. Tubize players
R. Wallonia Walhain Chaumont-Gistoux players
Challenger Pro League players
Association football fullbacks